Ruan may refer to:

Buildings
Ruan Center, office building in Des Moines, Iowa
John Ruan House, historic mansion in Philadelphia, Pennsylvania

Places 
Ruan, County Clare, Ireland
Ruan, Loiret, France
Mont Ruan, Switzerland
Ruan Major and Ruan Minor, two settlements in Cornwall, UK, forming part of the civil parish of Grade–Ruan
Ruan Lanihorne, a civil parish and village in south Cornwall

People 
Ruan (footballer, born 1991), Brazilian football player, full name Ruan Teixeira Silva
Ruan Renato (born 1994), Brazilian football player
Ruan (footballer, born 1995), Brazilian football player, full name Ruan Gregório Teixeira
Ruan (footballer, born 1998), Brazilian football player, full name Ruan Vinicius Silva de Jesus
Ruan (footballer, born 2005), Brazilian football player, full name Ruan Pereira Duarte
Ruan (surname)

Other uses 
Ruan (instrument), a family of Chinese stringed instruments